Sinister Beauty is the first studio album by American dance music production duo Windimoto.

Background information 
After the release of Windimoto's debut EP, The Travels Of Windimoto, the duo decided to form their own label for the release of future projects. While establishing their label, Windimoto Music, the duo set to work on their first full-length album. The sessions were informal because the duo recorded a great deal of material while The Travels Of Windimoto was being released and promoted.

Aside from songs culled from previous sessions, four new songs were written and recorded once it was decided to release an album. Members Sean Haley and Scorpeze recorded both together and separately to complete the sessions.

"Love You More", "Fever", "Find The Way", and "Shake It Down" were recorded in 2007, while "A Penthouse View" and "Smooth It Down" (a remix of "Shake It Down" by Sean Haley) were recorded in the first half of 2008. The new songs ("There Are Better Days For Us", "Sinister Beauty", "Three Scenes", and "An Afternoon In Rio") were recorded in the fall of 2008. Mixing of the album started in Fall 2008 and was completed in January 2009.

The duo wanted to present a varied yet cohesive album to showcase the broad range of dance music and also their versatility as songwriters and producers. The styles on the album include standard deep house, electronica, Caribbean, Latin jazz, disco, downtempo, ambient, spoken word, and Brazilian bossa nova. Sensing the growing commercial appeal of dance music, the duo decided to include a better balance of vocal and instrumental tracks than on their previous release.

Track listing 

All tracks written by Sean Haley and Scorpeze; except where indicated.

 "There Are Better Days For Us" - 5:29
 "Fever" - 5:38
 "Sinister Beauty" - 6:01
 "Find The Way" (Haley, Scorpeze, Fiona Mahon) - 3:36
 "Shake It Down" - 5:29
 "Love You More (Holding On)" - 5:28
 "Three Scenes" (Haley, Scorpeze, Francis Adams) - 4:37
 "A Penthouse View" - 5:49
 "An Afternoon In Rio (Only You)" (Haley, Scorpeze, Fiona Mahon) - 5:23
 "Smooth It Down (DJ Sean Haley's Negra Luna Mix)" - 5:30

Personnel 
 Sean Haley - drums, percussion, synthesizers, samples, sequencing, drum and synthesizer programming
 Scorpeze - Rhodes electric piano, piano, organ, synthesizers, bass, samples, sequencing, synthesizer programming
 Drew Krag - guitar on "An Afternoon In Rio (Only You)"
 Perry Vasquez - guitar on "Shake It Down"
 Odus Ricker - tubular bells on "Love You More (Holding On)"
 Trisha Newstead - flute on "An Afternoon In Rio (Only You)"
 Paulo Conte - timbales on "Fever"
 Karen Wolczk - violin
 LaTasha Bond - violin
 Rodney Lane - viola
 Jarvis Minton - cello
 JV - vocals on "There Are Better Days For Us"
 Jaya - vocals on "Love You More (Holding On)"
 Fiona Mahon - vocals on "Find The Way" and "An Afternoon In Rio (Only You)"
 Francis Adams - vocals on "Three Scenes"
 Sean Owens - Mix engineer
 Tye Hill - Engineer; vocals/"There Are Better Days For Us"
 Trevor Goodchilde - Engineer; vocals/"Find the Way" and "An Afternoon In Rio"
 Harvy Allbangers - Engineer, co-production; vocals/"Love You More"
 Adam Pearthree - Engineer; vocals/"Three Scenes"

External links 
 
 Downloadable cover art, liner notes, and commentary about the making of the album by Windimoto
 
 
 Potholes In My Blog review of Sinister Beauty
 Streaming podcast of Sinister Beauty

2009 albums
Windimoto albums